Pa Phai may refer to several places in Thailand:

 Pa Phai, Chiang Mai
Pa Phai, Lamphun